is a Japanese novelist. She is a 1965 recipient of the Akutagawa Prize.

Early life 
Tsumura was born in the capital city of Fukui, Japan. Her mother died when she was nine years old. Two years later, she moved to Tokyo. Her father, a silk weaver, died when she was sixteen. Between 1947 and 1948, at the age of nineteen, Tsumura ran her own dressmaking shop, employing three other seamstresses. Despite the success of her business, she closed the shop to attend Gakushuuin Women's Junior College, where she studied literature and edited the student literary magazine. She met her husband, Akira Yoshimura (1927 - 2006), while contributing to the literary magazine at his college. Tsumura graduated in 1953 and married soon after.

Career 
Tsumura was nominated for the Naoki Prize in 1959 for her short story, "Kagi" (Key), which she wrote for the Bungakukai magazine. She was awarded the Akutagawa Prize in 1965 for her short story "Gangu" (Playthings), a story about an expectant mother who is disappointed by her husband's indifference in their pregnancy. In 1972, Tsumura's short story, "Saihate" (The Farthest Limit) won the Shincho Prize. It was based on Tsumura's personal experience after the collapse of her husband's business.

Tsumura's 1983 biographical novel, "Shirayuri no kishi" (Precipice of a White Lily) is about a poetess from Tsumura's native Fukui; Tomiko Yamakawa (1879 - 1909).

Tsumura's novel, "Ryuuseiu" (A Meteoric Shower) won the Women's Literature Prize in 1990. It depicted the Boshin War from the perspective of a 15-year-old girl.

She is a member of the Japan Art Academy and was recognized as a person of cultural merit in 2016.

Bibliography 
Type of literary work denoted in parentheses.

Translated works 
Tsumura's 1969 short story "Yakoodokei" (夜光時計) was translated under the title "Luminous Watch." It is included in the anthology This Kind of Woman: Ten Stories by Japanese Women Writers by Elizabeth Hanson and Yukiko Tanaka.

"Gangu," the short story that won Tsumura the Akutagawa Prize, was translated by Kyoko Evanhoe and Robert N. Lawson for the Japan Quarterly in 1980 under the name "Playthings."

References 

20th-century novelists
1928 births
Japanese writers
Akutagawa Prize winners
Japanese women novelists
Living people